Ethnic Georgians in Spain number around 15,000 and live mostly in Madrid.

Notable people

See also 
 Georgia–Spain relations

References 

Georgian diaspora
Expatriates from Georgia (country) in Spain
Ethnic groups in Spain